Fodinoidea rectifascia is a moth of the family Erebidae. It was described by Cyril Leslie Collenette in 1930. It is found on Madagascar.

References

 

Spilosomina
Moths described in 1930